Adriaan Gustaaf Count van Flodroff (also Flodorf or Flodorph, died 1690) was a Dutch soldier. 

He first joined the Dutch Army in 1671, and by 1683 had risen to become a Major General of cavalry. In 1689, following the outbreak of the Nine Years War, he was sent with a detachment to persuade Liège to abandon its neutrality and join the Grand Alliance, a mission which proved successful. The same year he took part in the Siege of Bonn. He was killed at the Battle of Fleurus in 1690.

References

Bibliography
 Childs, John. The Nine Years' War and the British Army, 1688-97. Manchester University Press, 1991.

17th-century Dutch military personnel
Year of birth unknown
1690 deaths
Dutch military personnel killed in action